The Archdeacon of Raphoe is a senior ecclesiastical officer within the Anglican Diocese of Derry and Raphoe. As such he or she is responsible for the disciplinary supervision of the clergy  within the Raphoe part of the diocese, which is by far the largest.

The archdeaconry can trace its history back to Thomas O'Nahan, who held the office from 1299 to 1306, to the current incumbent  David Huss who assumed office in 2013.

Archdeacons of Raphoe

References

 
Lists of Anglican archdeacons in Ireland